Wang Huei-chen (Pinyin: Wáng Huì-zhēn; born 21 February 1970) is a former Taiwanese track and field athlete, who specialized in sprinting events. She twice represented her country at the Summer Olympics (1992 and 1996). Wang also competed at three World Championships in Athletics and three IAAF World Indoor Championships (1991, 1993 and 1995).

She was a medalist at three editions of the Asian Athletics Championships and won four medals at the Asian Games during her career, including the 200 metres gold medal at the 1994 Asian Games. She was the 1991 Summer Universiade champion in the 200 m and is a former Asian record holder for the event with her personal best of 22.56 seconds, set in 1992. This time remains Taiwanese record for the 200 m and she also holds the record for the 4x100 m relay.

International competitions

Personal bests

References

External links

1970 births
Living people
Taiwanese female sprinters
Olympic athletes of Taiwan
Athletes (track and field) at the 1992 Summer Olympics
Athletes (track and field) at the 1996 Summer Olympics
Asian Games medalists in athletics (track and field)
Asian Games gold medalists for Chinese Taipei
Asian Games silver medalists for Chinese Taipei
Athletes (track and field) at the 1990 Asian Games
Athletes (track and field) at the 1994 Asian Games
World Athletics Championships athletes for Chinese Taipei
Universiade medalists in athletics (track and field)
Medalists at the 1990 Asian Games
Medalists at the 1994 Asian Games
Universiade gold medalists for Chinese Taipei
Universiade bronze medalists for Chinese Taipei
Medalists at the 1991 Summer Universiade
Medalists at the 1993 Summer Universiade
20th-century Taiwanese women